The Robert-Bourassa Reservoir is a man-made lake in northern Quebec, Canada. It was created in the mid-1970s as part of the James Bay Project and provides the needed water for the Robert-Bourassa and La Grande-2-A generating stations.

The reservoir is formed behind the Robert-Bourassa Dam that was built across a valley of the La Grande River. This dam was constructed from 1974 to 1978, is 550 m (1,800 ft) wide at its base, and has 23 million m3 (30 million yd3) of fill. There are another 31 smaller dikes keeping the water inside the reservoir.

See also
List of lakes of Quebec

References

External links
 International Lake Environment Committee – La Grande 2 Reservoir

Lakes of Nord-du-Québec
Reservoirs in Quebec
James Bay Project